Sooryakanthi is a 1977 Indian Malayalam film,  directed by Baby. Screenplay and story are by Surasu. The film stars Sukumaran, Sudheer, Kuthiravattam Pappu, M. G. Soman and Mallika Sukumaran in the lead roles. The film has musical score by Jaya Vijaya.

Cast

Sukumaran
M. G. Soman
Sudheer

Kuthiravattam Pappu
Mallika Sukumaran

Soundtrack
The music was composed by Jaya Vijaya and the lyrics were written by Poovachal Khader and Dr. Pavithran.

References

External links
 

1977 films
1970s Malayalam-language films
Films scored by Jaya Vijaya
Films directed by Baby (director)